Herman Riley (August 31, 1933 – April 14, 2007) was a jazz saxophonist who was a studio musician in Los Angeles. He worked with Gene Ammons, Lorez Alexandria, Count Basie, Bobby Bryant, Donald Byrd, Benny Carter, Quincy Jones, Shelly Manne, Blue Mitchell, and Joe Williams. He died of heart failure in Los Angeles at the age of 73.

Discography
 Herman (1986)

As sideman
With Bobby Bryant
 1967 Ain't Doing Too B-A-D
 1971 Swahili Strut

With Blue Mitchell
 The Last Tango = Blues (Mainstream, 1973)
 Blues' Blues (Mainstream, 1972)
 Graffiti Blues (Mainstream, 1973)
 African Violet (Impulse!, 1977)
 Summer Soft (Impulse!, 1978)

With Lorez Alexandria
 1980 Sings the Songs of Johnny Mercer, Vol. 1
 1984 Sings the Songs of Johnny Mercer, Vol. 2: Harlem Butterfly
 1984 Sings the Songs of Johnny Mercer, Vol. 3: Tangerine
 1992 I'll Never Stop Loving You

With Roger Neumann
 1983 Introducing Roger Neumann's Rather Large Band
 1993 Instant Heat

With Kenny Burrell
 1994 Collaboration
 2007 75th Birthday Bash Live!
 2003 Blue Muse

With Charles Wright
 2004 High Maintenance Woman
 2006 Finally Got It... Wright

With Jimmy Smith
 1989 Prime Time
 1993 Sum Serious Blues
 2001 Dot Com Blues

With others
 1967 One More Time, Della Reese
 1968 Hard Times, Roy Brown
 1971 Head On, Bobby Hutcherson
 1971 Free Again, Gene Ammons
 1974 Live & in Concert, Four Tops
 1976 Albert, Albert King
 1978 The Live at the Century Plaza, Frank Capp
 1978 Where Go the Boats, John Handy
 1979 Tango Palace, Dr. John
 1981 Swing Street Cafe, Joe Sample/David T. Walker
 1981 The Way I Am, Billy Preston
 1981 Touch, Gladys Knight & the Pips
 1986 At Vine St. Live, Maxine Sullivan
 1987 Digital Duke, Mercer Ellington
 1988 The Singer, Richard B. Boone
 1989 The Fabulous Baker Boys, Dave Grusin
 1989 Boogie Down, Ernestine Anderson
 1991 Fine and Mellow, Ruth Brown
 1992 Calamba, Andy Simpkins Quintet
 1995 Time After Time, Etta James
 2000 Everybody's Talkin' Bout Miss Thing, Lavay Smith & Her Red Hot Skillet Lickers
 2005 The Jazz Composer's Songbook, John Heard

References 

Contact Music Obituary

American jazz tenor saxophonists
American male saxophonists
Jazz musicians from New Orleans
1933 births
2007 deaths
20th-century American saxophonists
20th-century American male musicians
American male jazz musicians